The Bolshevik Samasamaja Party was the Ceylon section Bolshevik-Leninist Party of India, Ceylon and Burma (BLPI) after 1945 and of the Fourth International in 1948-1950, after the dissolution of the BLPI.

After the war there was a split in the Lanka Sama Samaja Party (LSSP). N.M. Perera and Philip Gunawardena, who had opposed a merger into the BLPI, reconstructed the LSSP as an independent party. Members of the other section, formed out of the exiled BLPI nucleus, effectively maintained a separate party, the Bolshevik Samasamaja Party (BSP). The latter group functioned as the Ceylon section of BLPI and was led by Colvin R de Silva, Leslie Goonawardene and Edmund Samarakkoddy.

The relation between the two groups was often antagonistic. The BSP, which concentrated on building a cadre party, accused LSSP of 'organisational Menshevism'. The LSSP wanted to build a mass-based party and accused the BSP of being introvert doctrinaires.  On 25 October 1945 fist-fights broke out between the two groups at a meeting of the BSP.  

In 1946 there was a brief reconciliation between the two factions. At the general election of 1947, the LSSP emerged as the main opposition party, with 10 seats. The BSP obtained 5 seats.

The BLPI-affiliated BSP became an independent party in 1948, and was recognized as the Lankan section of the Fourth International, when the BLPI was dissolved.

In 1950 the LSSP and BSP merged once again. The membership in the Fourth International was passed on to LSSP. When the group around Anil Moonesinghe split from the LSSP in 1982, he charged that the party had been taken over by the BSP faction.

1948 establishments in Ceylon
1950 disestablishments in Ceylon
Communist parties in Sri Lanka
Defunct political parties in Sri Lanka
Political parties established in 1948
Political parties disestablished in 1950
Political parties in Sri Lanka
Trotskyist organisations in Sri Lanka